The Thailand women's national under-18 and under-19 basketball team is a national basketball team of Thailand and is governed by the Basketball Sport Association of Thailand. It represents the country in international under-19 and under-18 (under age 19 and under age 18) women's basketball competitions.

See also
Thailand women's national basketball team
Thailand women's national under-17 basketball team
Thailand men's national under-19 basketball team

References

External links
Archived records of Thailand team participations

Under
Women's national under-19 basketball teams
Youth sport in Thailand